Kaqchikel, also spelled Kaqchickel, Kakchiquel, Cachiquel, Cakchikel, Caqchikel, or Cakchiquel, may refer to:
 Kaqchikel people, an ethnic subgroup of the Maya
 Kaqchikel language, the language spoken by that people

Language and nationality disambiguation pages